Governador Celso Ramos is a municipality in the state of Santa Catarina in the South region of Brazil.

See also
List of municipalities in Santa Catarina

References

Populated coastal places in Santa Catarina (state)
Municipalities in Santa Catarina (state)